Budmerice is a village and municipality in western Slovakia in  Pezinok District in the Bratislava region.

Names and etymology
The name comes from Slavic magnate name  BudeměrЪ with Slavic/Slovak suffix -ice. The name was adopted by Germans as Pudmeritz what influenced also later Slovak name Pudmerice. In the 13-14 centuries, the name of Hungarian origin Kerestúr (1296 Keresthwr) had been also used in parallel, but was abandoned in favour of Slovak resp. German form (Pudmeritz, in 1899 renamed to Gidrafa).

See also
 List of municipalities and towns in Slovakia

References

Genealogical resources

The records for genealogical research are available at the state archive "Statny Archiv in Bratislava, Slovakia"

 Roman Catholic church records (births/marriages/deaths): 1774-1895 (parish A)

External links

 Official page
http://budmerice.net
Surnames of living people in Budmerice

Villages and municipalities in Pezinok District